Tralee is a town in Ireland.

Other uses:

Places
 Tralee, New South Wales
 Tralee, West Virginia

Things
 HMS Tralee (1918), UK minesweeper

See also
 The Rose of Tralee (disambiguation)
 Tralee (UK Parliament constituency)
 Tralee Bay